City Centre Muscat is a shopping mall located on Sultan Qaboos Road  from Muscat International Airport), Seeb, Muscat Governorate, Sultanate of Oman. The mall opened in October 2001. It was developed and is managed by Majid Al Futtaim Properties.

In June 2013, the mall announced a second redevelopment to add  of retail space dedicated to entertainment and leisure.

Shops / food and beverage
City Centre Muscat houses 142 international and local brands including the following anchor stores:
 
 Carrefour Hypermarket – 
 Home Centre – 
 Centrepoint – 
 Max Fashion – 
 Emax – 
 Zara and Zara Home – 
 Marks & Spencer – 
 Toys R Us – 
 H&M – 
 Sun & Sand Sports – 
 Magic Planet
 Gap
  Bershka 
 Virgin Megastore
American Eagle Outfitters
MANGO Fashion
Starbucks
Buffalo Wild Wings
Forever 21
PAUL

The mall also has 18 restaurants, cafés, and fast food outlets, with seating capacity for over a thousand people. It includes VOX Cinemas complex for film entertainment.

References

External links
 Muscat City Centre official website

2001 establishments in Oman
Shopping malls established in 2001
Shopping malls in Oman
Buildings and structures in Muscat, Oman
Seeb